was established in Miyazaki, Japan, in 1995. The collection focuses on artists from or associated with Miyazaki Prefecture and also includes works by Picasso, Klee, and Magritte.

See also
 Miyazaki Prefectural Museum of Nature and History
 Miyazaki Jingū

References

External links
  Miyazaki Prefectural Art Museum
  Miyazaki Prefectural Art Museum

Museums in Miyazaki Prefecture
Miyazaki (city)
Art museums and galleries in Japan
Prefectural museums
Art museums established in 1995
1995 establishments in Japan